The third season of Too Hot to Handle premiered on January 19, 2022. The season was ordered by Netflix in January 2021, and was filmed amid the COVID-19 pandemic on the Turks and Caicos Islands, right after season 2 wrapped.

Cast

Episodes

After filming 

In February 2021, Beaux Raymond, Harry Johnson, and Jackson Mawhinney caused a ruckus on a flight to the UK. They were fined £3,000 each and were arrested after landing.

In April/May 2022, Georgia Hassarati began dating season 1 contestant Harry Jowsey, they broke up in October/November, but resumed their relationship in February 2023.

References 

2022 American television seasons